Elaeocarpus bojeri, locally known as a bois dentelle ('lace wood' in French), descriptive of its delicate white flowers) is a species of flowering plant in the Elaeocarpaceae family. The species was once only found close to an Indian temple at Grand Bassin in Mauritius, where fewer than ten individuals were known to grow in the 1990s.

Conservation

It is not threatened because of being exploited itself, rather because its environment is being overrun by more commercially attractive alien species such as Psidium cattleyanum and Litsea monopetala.

See also
 List of Elaeocarpus species

References

bojeri
Endemic flora of Mauritius
Critically endangered plants
Taxonomy articles created by Polbot